Forest Heath District Council in Suffolk, England was elected every four years. between  the last boundary changes in 2003 and the final elections in 2015, 27 councillors were elected from 14 wards. The council was abolished in 2019, with the area becoming part of West Suffolk.

Political control
From the first election to the council in 1973 until its abolition in 2019, political control of the council was held by the following parties:

Leadership
The leaders of the council from 1995 until 2019 were:

James Waters served as leader of the West Suffolk shadow authority prior to the new council coming into effect in 2019, but he was unsuccessful in securing a seat at the first election to the new council.

Council elections
1973 Forest Heath District Council election
1976 Forest Heath District Council election
1979 Forest Heath District Council election (New ward boundaries)
1983 Forest Heath District Council election
1987 Forest Heath District Council election
1991 Forest Heath District Council election (District boundary changes took place but the number of seats remained the same)
1995 Forest Heath District Council election (District boundary changes took place but the number of seats remained the same)
1999 Forest Heath District Council election
2003 Forest Heath District Council election (New ward boundaries increased the number of seats by 2)
2007 Forest Heath District Council election
2011 Forest Heath District Council election
2015 Forest Heath District Council election

By-election results

1995-1999

2003-2007

2007-2011

References

By-election results

External links
Forest Heath Council

 
Council elections in Suffolk
District council elections in England